Gu Yidong (also known as Yih-Tong Ku, 1903–1996) was a Chinese chemist, considered a founder of inorganic chemistry in China. He was an academician and founding member of the Chinese Academy of Sciences. Gu received his Ph.D. in organic chemistry from University of Chicago in 1935.

References

1903 births
1996 deaths
Chemists from Jiangsu
Educators from Suzhou
Academic staff of Fudan University
Members of the Chinese Academy of Sciences
Scientists from Suzhou